A grading system for way-marked off-road cycling trails has been adopted in the UK, and is used by official bodies such as Forestry England and IMBA-UK. It was originally developed by Cyclists' Touring Club (CTC) employee Colin Palmer in June 1999, based on a system widely used for grading cross-country skiing routes.

A solitary major hazard (e.g. one steep hill or a difficult junction) will not necessarily raise an otherwise 'Easy' route into a 'Difficult' one.

UK trails by grade

Severe
 The Forest of Ae: Ae Downhill Course (part of 7stanes project)
 Afan Forest Park: Skyline Trail
 Ampthill Forest: Dual slalom Downhill Course
 Coed-y-Brenin: Red Bull Trail and Karrimor Trail
 Cwmcarn: Y Mynydd Mojo
 Dalby Forest
 Glentress Forest: V-Trail
 Guisborough Forest
 Hamsterley Forest
 Hopton Wood
 Innerleithen Forest: Forestry England/Red Bull Project Downhill
 Machynlleth: Cli-Mach-X
 Thetford Forest

Difficult
 The Forest of Ae: Ae Line (part of 7stanes project)
 Afan: White's Level, Penhydd Trail, & The Wall
 Argyll Forest Park: Glenbranter Cycle Splash & Ardgartan Peninsula Circuit
 Ben Aigan: Blue Cycle Trail
 Brechfa: Abergorlech Red Trail
 Coed-y-Brenin: MBR Trail & Sport Trail
 Cwmcarn: Twrch Trail
 Dalby Forest: Red Cycle Trail
 Durris Forest: Cairn Spur
 Fetteresso Forest: Drumtochty Through Route Forest Trail & Bervie Loop Forest Trail
 Forest of Dean: FODCA Trail
 Gartly Moor Forest: Red Trail & Blue Trail
 Glentress Forest: Red Grade Freeride Area & Red Grade Trail
 Great Glen Forest: Great Glen Mountain Bike Trail
 Grizedale Forest: Hawkshead Moor & Silurian Way Cycle Trail
 Gwydyr Forest: Marin Trail
 Hamsterley Forest: Neighbour Moor Tour Cycle Route & Red Cycle Trail
 Hopton Wood 
 Kielder Forest: The Swinburne Collection
 Kirkhill Forest: South Spur Cycle Trail
 Llanwrtyd Wells: Esgair Dafydd Trail, Irfon Forest Route & Mynydd Trawsnant Route
 Machynlleth: Mach 3 Trail 
 Bwlch Nant yr Arian: Summit Trail & Syfydrin Trail
 Pitfichie Forest
 Tay Forest
 Whiteash Forest: Whiteash Loopie

Mountain biking venues in the United Kingdom